Cucciago is a comune (municipality) in the Province of Como in the Italian region Lombardy, located about  north of Milan and about  south of Como. As of 31 December 2004, it had a population of 3,205 and an area of 5.0 km².

Cucciago borders the following municipalities: Cantù, Casnate con Bernate, Fino Mornasco, Senna Comasco, Vertemate con Minoprio.

Cucciago is served by Cucciago railway station.

Demographic evolution

References

Cities and towns in Lombardy